The German Class 23 (Baureihe 23 or BR 23) engines of the Deutsche Reichsbahn (DRG) were standard (Einheitslokomotiven) steam engines that were conceived as a replacement for the  Prussian P 8 by the Schichau Works. They were given the same boiler as the Class 50s which were developed in parallel and, like them, the newly developed 2'2' T 26 tender with its front wall that protected train crews during reverse running.

In 1941 the two prototypes were built and delivered. The procurement of 800 locomotives had been planned, however the constraints of the Second World War meant that they never entered full production.

After the war the two locomotives, with operating numbers 23 001 and 23 002, went to the DR in East Germany and were variously stabled in Berlin, Brandenburg an der Havel, Jüterbog and Halle. In 1961, number 23 001 was given a Reko boiler with combustion chamber, developed for the Class 50. In 1970 the locomotive was given EDP number 35 2001–2. Number 23 002 was to be reconstructed, but was retired however in 1967 due to damage to the frame and scrapped.
Number 23 001 was scrapped in 1975 in Cottbus, as it could no longer serve any useful purpose.

After the war, the design of these Class 23 locomotives formed the basis for the new DB Class 23 and DR Class 23.10 locomotives which received the same class designation.

See also
 List of DRG locomotives and railbuses

References

23
2-6-2 locomotives
23
Railway locomotives introduced in 1941
Passenger locomotives
Standard gauge locomotives of Germany
1′C1′ h2 locomotives
Schichau-Werke locomotives